Tea Creek is a stream in the U.S. state of West Virginia.

Tea Creek was so named on account of its water being stained brown like tea.

See also
List of rivers of West Virginia

References

Rivers of Pocahontas County, West Virginia
Rivers of West Virginia